"Your Body's Callin" is a song by American singer and songwriter R. Kelly, released in April 1994 as the third single from his debut album, 12 Play (1993). It peaked at number 13 on the US Billboard Hot 100 and reached the top 40 in New Zealand and the United Kingdom. Kelly also released a remix as a B-side to the single featuring Aaliyah called the "Your Body's Calling His N Hers Mix".

Critical reception
Andy Beevers from Music Week gave the song four out of five. He wrote, "Having narrowly missed out on a mainstream Top 40 placing with his last single, "Bump'n'Grind", R Kelly looks set to be more successful with this smooth and mellow soul ballad. Not only is it a stronger song, but it will be helped by the US singer's recent UK tour, which included a four-night stint at the Apollo Hammersmith." James Hamilton from the RM Dance Update deemed it a "sexy tortuous 67bpm slow jam".

Music video
The accompanying music video for "Your Body's Callin'" was directed by American music video, television and film director Millicent Shelton. The video, set to appear that it was filmed in the summer, was filmed in the winter.

Charts

Weekly charts

Year-end charts

Certifications

Release history

Samplings and covers

 Hip hop producer DJ Premier sampled Kelly singing "It's unbelievable" for The Notorious B.I.G.'s song "Unbelievable" on his album Ready to Die released later in 1994. 
 The song has been interpolated the line by Ron Isley's longtime collaborator Kelly by The Isley Brothers on the song "Warm Summer Nights", with background vocals by Angela Winbush towards the end of the track from the album Eternal, released in 2001. 
 The song has also been sampled by Whodini on the song "Be My Lady" also featuring Kelly, from their album Six.
 Norman Brown covered the song in 1996 in his album Better Days Ahead.

References

1993 songs
1994 singles
Aaliyah songs
Jive Records singles
R. Kelly songs
Song recordings produced by R. Kelly
Songs written by R. Kelly